Esmaili District is a district (bakhsh) in Anbarabad County, Kerman Province, Iran. At the 2006 census, its population was 37,062, in 7,719 families.  The district has no cities. The district has three rural districts (dehestan): Esmaili Rural District, Ganjabad Rural District, and Hoseynabad Rural District.

References 

Anbarabad County
Districts of Kerman Province